Onomastus of Smyrna was the first Olympic victor in boxing at the 23rd Olympiad, 688 BC, when this sport was added. According to Philostratus, Pausanias and Eusebius, Onomastus  was not only the first Olympic boxing champion but he wrote the rules of Ancient Greek boxing as well. Pausanias adds that Smyrna was already then part of Ionia. (Onomastos means famous, literally "having a name, onoma").

References

Ancient Greek boxers
Ancient Olympic competitors
Ancient Smyrnaeans
People from İzmir
7th-century BC Greek people
Greek male boxers